In mathematical biology, the community matrix is the linearization of a generalized Lotka–Volterra equation at an equilibrium point. The eigenvalues of the community matrix determine the stability of the equilibrium point.

For example, the Lotka–Volterra predator–prey model is

where x(t) denotes the number of prey, y(t) the number of predators, and α, β, γ and δ are constants. By the Hartman–Grobman theorem the non-linear system is topologically equivalent to a linearization of the system about an equilibrium point (x*, y*), which has the form

where u = x − x* and v = y − y*. In mathematical biology, the Jacobian matrix  evaluated at the equilibrium point (x*, y*) is called the community matrix. By the stable manifold theorem, if one or both eigenvalues of  have positive real part then the equilibrium is unstable, but if all eigenvalues have negative real part then it is stable.

See also
 Paradox of enrichment

References 

 .

Mathematical and theoretical biology
Population ecology
Dynamical systems